An Einstein–Rosen bridge, or wormhole, is a postulated method, within the general theory of relativity, of moving from one point in space to another without crossing the space between. Wormholes are a popular feature of science fiction as they allow faster-than-light interstellar travel within human timescales.

A related concept in various fictional genres is the portable hole. While there's no clear demarcation between the two, this article deals with fictional, but pseudo-scientific, treatments of faster-than-light travel through space.

A jumpgate is a fictional device able to create an Einstein–Rosen bridge portal (or wormhole), allowing fast travel between two points in space.

In franchises

Stargate franchise

Wormholes are the principal means of space travel in the Stargate movie and the spin-off television series, Stargate SG-1, Stargate Atlantis and Stargate Universe, to the point where it was called the franchise that is "far and away most identified with wormholes".

The central plot device of the programs is an ancient transportation network consisting of the ring-shaped devices known as Stargates, which generate artificial wormholes that allow one-way matter transmission and two-way radio communication between gates when the correct spatial coordinates are "dialed". However, for some reason not yet explained, the water-like event horizon breaks down the matter and converts it into energy for transport through the wormhole, restoring it into its original state at the destination. This would explain why electromagnetic energy can travel both ways — it doesn't have to be converted.

The one-way rule may be caused by the Stargates themselves: as a Gate may only be capable of creating an event-horizon that either breaks down or reconstitutes matter, but not both. It does serve as a very useful plot device: when one wants to return to the other end one must close the original wormhole and "redial", which means one needs access to the dialing device. The one-way nature of the Stargates helps to defend the gate from unwanted incursions. Also, Stargates can sustain an artificial wormhole for only 38 minutes. It's possible to keep it active for a longer period, but it would take immense amounts of energy. The wormholes generated by the Stargates are based on the misconception that wormholes in 3D space have 2D (circular) event horizons, but a proper visualization of a wormhole in 3D space would be a spherical event horizon.

Babylon 5 and Crusade
In television series Babylon 5 and its spin-off series Crusade, jump points are artificial wormholes that serve as entrances and exits to hyperspace, allowing for faster-than-light travel. Jump points can either be created by larger ships (battleships, destroyers, etc.) or by standalone jumpgates. The more energy used to create the wormhole, the larger the opening will be, so the stand-alone gates are used for heavily trafficked, predetermined interstellar routes, while engines on ships serve as a means of travel primarily for that ship and its support vessels, allowing them to enter and exit hyperspace where a jumpgate is not conveniently close by in normal space.

Three distinct types of wormhole are characterized in the series and its sequel stories.

The jump points created by both the jumpgates and large vessels characterize a Lorentzian traversable wormhole with intra-universal endpoints. In the series, however, rather than the exiting endpoint being defined at the time of entry, the ship enters non-Euclidean hyperspace within which tachyon beacons mark possible endpoint destinations in real space. A ship may enter hyperspace with no particular destination, linger or hide there before returning to normal space, even be lost irretrievably should it become unable to exit into normal space.

As established in the episode "Movements of Fire and Shadow", jumpgates are considered neutral territory. Thus, it would be a gross violation of rules of engagement to attack them directly, as the jumpgate network is needed by every spacefaring race. However it is a common wartime tactic for opponents to program their jumpgates to deny access by any enemy ships, thus forcing those forces to open their own jump points.

The second type of wormhole depicted in the series is temporal in nature, as when the Great Machine buried miles below the surface of Epsilon Eridani III, a massive alien complex for the generation and control of power on a solar scale, displaces Babylon 4 1000 years into the past, 24 hours after it becomes fully functional, taking Commander Sinclair with it into the past to begin preparations a millennium in advance for the coming war with the Shadows, creating a temporal paradox.

The third type of wormhole appears in the series sequel Babylon 5: Thirdspace, as an ancient Vorlon artifact is found drifting in hyperspace and is recovered and brought back into normal space. The device is revealed to be a jumpgate for the creation of an extra-universal Lorentzian wormhole, which opens into a universe dominated by an incredibly powerful and ruthlessly violent alien race.

Farscape
The television series Farscape features an American astronaut who accidentally gets shot through a wormhole and ends up in a distant part of the universe, and also features the use of wormholes to reach other universes (or "unrealized realities") and as weapons of mass destruction.

Wormholes are the cause of John Crichton's presence in the far reaches of our galaxy and the focus of an arms race of different alien species attempting to obtain Crichton's perceived ability to control them. Crichton's brain was secretly implanted with knowledge of wormhole technology by one of the last members of an ancient alien species. Later, an alien interrogator discovers the existence of the hidden information and thus Crichton becomes embroiled in interstellar politics and warfare while being pursued by all sides (as they want the ability to use wormholes as weapons). Unable to directly access the information, Crichton is able to subconsciously foretell when and where wormholes will form and is able to safely travel through them (while all attempts by others are fatal). By the end of the series, he eventually works out some of the science and is able to create his own wormholes (and shows his pursuers the consequences of a wormhole weapon).

Star Trek franchise
Objects with the features similar to wormholes were featured in episodes of Star Trek: The Original Series, although the word wormhole was not used. The gateway featured in the episode "The City on the Edge of Forever", for example, was a gateway through time that operates somewhat similar to a wormhole.
Early in the storyline of Star Trek: The Motion Picture, an antimatter imbalance in the refitted Enterprise starship's warp drive power systems creates an unstable ship-generated wormhole directly ahead of the vessel, threatening to rip the starship apart partially through its increasingly severe time dilation effects, until Commander Pavel Chekov fires a photon torpedo to blast apart a sizable asteroid that was pulled in with the starship (and directly ahead of it), destabilizing the wormhole effect and throwing the Enterprise clear as it slowed to sub-light velocities. Near the end of the film, Willard Decker recalls that "Voyager 6" (a.k.a. V'ger) disappeared into what they used to call a "black hole". At one time, black holes in science fiction were often endowed with the traits of wormholes. This has for the most part disappeared as a black hole isn't necessarily a hole in space but a dense mass and the visible vortex effect often associated with black holes is merely the accretion disk of visible matter being drawn toward it. Decker's line is most likely to inform that it was probably a wormhole that Voyager 6 entered, although the intense gravity of a black hole does warp the fabric of spacetime.
The setting of the television series Star Trek: Deep Space Nine is a space station, Deep Space 9, located near the artificially-created Bajoran wormhole. This wormhole is unique in the Star Trek universe because of its stability. In an earlier episode of Star Trek: The Next Generation it was established that wormholes are generally unstable on one or both ends – either the end(s) move erratically or they do not open reliably. The Bajoran wormhole is stationary on both ends and opens consistently. It provides passage to the distant Gamma Quadrant, opening a gate to starships that extends far beyond the reach normally attainable, is the source of a severe threat to the Alpha Quadrant from an empire called the Dominion, and is home to a group of non-physical life forms which make contact with Commander Benjamin Sisko and have also interacted with the Bajorans in the past. Discovered at the start of the series, the existence of the wormhole and the various consequences of its discovery elevate the strategic importance of the space station and is a major factor in most of the overarching plots over the course of the series.
In Star Trek: Voyager, in episode "Counterpoint", an alien scientist explains that the term wormhole is often used as a layman's term and describes various spatial anomalies. Examples for those wormholes in Star Trek are intermittent cyclical vortex, interspatial fissure, interspatial flexure or spatial flexure in episode "Q2" respectively spatial vortex in episode "Night". In the episode "Inside Man" an artificially created wormhole was named geodesic fold.
 In the 2009 Star Trek film, red matter is used to create artificial black holes. A large one acts a conduit between spacetime and sends Spock and Nero back in time.

Doctor Who
The Rift which appears in the long-running British science-fiction series Doctor Who and its spin-off Torchwood is a wormhole. One of its mouths is located in Cardiff Bay, Wales and the other floats freely throughout space-time. It is the central plot device in the latter show.
In "Planet of the Dead", a wormhole transports a London double-decker bus to a barren, desert-like planet. The wormhole could only be navigated safely through by a metal object, and human tissue is not meant for inter-space travel, as demonstrated by the bus driver, who is burnt to the bones on attempting to get back to Earth.

It is discussed that the Time Vortex was created by the Time Lords (an ancient and powerful race of human-looking aliens that can control space and time; the protagonist is one of them) to allow travel of TARDISes (Time And Relative Dimension In Space) to any point in spacetime.

Marvel Cinematic Universe
In the 2011 film Thor, the Bifrost is reimagined as an Einstein–Rosen Bridge which is operated by the gatekeeper, Heimdall, and used by Asgardians to travel between the Nine Realms.
In the 2011 film Captain America: The First Avenger, the Tesseract is stolen by Johann Schmidt, but opens a wormhole and teleports him to an unknown location, later revealed to be Vormir.
In the 2012 film The Avengers, Loki uses the Tesseract to arrive on Earth and summon the Chitauri to invade New York.
In the 2013 film Thor: The Dark World, the Bifrost Bridge is repaired using the Tesseract, and is once again used by Asgardians for space travel. Additionally, Jane Foster and her associates encounter a wormhole in London which teleports her to Svartalfheim.
In the 2014 film Guardians of the Galaxy, the Universal Neural Teleportation Network is shown to be the universal standard for space travel, in which hexagonal-shaped wormholes named "jump points" are generated by spaceships and allow instantaneous interstellar travel.
In the 2016 film Doctor Strange, the Masters of the Mystic Arts use Sling Rings to generate fiery wormholes, powered by Eldritch magic.
In the 2017 film Guardians of the Galaxy Vol. 2, numerous characters once again utilize the Universal Neural Teleportation Network to travel across the galaxy.
In the 2017 film Thor: Ragnarok, Thor is teleported to the planet Sakaar via a wormhole, where he learns that Bruce Banner and Loki had both landed on the planet via wormholes as well. The largest one, referred to as the "Devil's Anus", is described by Banner as "a collapsing Neutron Star within an Einstein-Rosen Bridge".
In the 2018 film Avengers: Infinity War, Thanos acquires the Space Stone from the Statesman and uses it to generate wormholes and travel between different points of the Universe.
In the 2019 film Captain Marvel, the Universal Neural Teleportation Network is used by the Kree to teleport between certain points in the galaxy.
In the 2019 film Avengers: Endgame, an alternate version of Loki escapes Stark Tower by generating a wormhole using the Tesseract, resulting in the Avengers formulating a different plan in order to acquire the Tesseract.
In the 2021 Disney+ series Loki, the 2012 variant of Loki is teleported to the Gobi Desert by the Tesseract, where he is captured by the Time Variance Authority (TVA). The TVA also uses TemPads to generate Time Doors, orange translucent portals which allow TVA agents to travel to different points in time.
In the 2021 Disney+ series What If...?, an alternate version of Johann Schmidt acquires the Tesseract and uses it summon an alien creature, which is defeated when Captain Carter pushes it back into the wormhole. Nearly 70 years later, Carter emerges from another wormhole and meets Nick Fury and Clint Barton.

In literature
In some earlier analyses of general relativity, the event horizon of a black hole was believed to form an Einstein-Rosen bridge. Works envisioning black holes as wormholes are listed in Black Holes as Wormhole Bridges.

 Gate in Ken Macleod's  Newton's Wake: A Space Opera.  Macleod's gates are entrances to the wormhole skein, a network of Visser-Kar wormholes, referred to as Carlyle's Drift.
 Wormholes feature in Peter F. Hamilton's Commonwealth Saga, connecting over 600 worlds.
 Land-based wormhole gates in Robert Charles Wilson's novel Spin.

In music

In games

In television and film fiction

See also
 Boom tube
 Space bridge

References

 
Lists of astronomical locations in fiction
Speculative fiction lists